Gliese 318 is a white dwarf in the constellation Pyxis. Its spectral type is DA5.5 and it has a visual magnitude of 11.85, which lies 26 light years away. The star was too faint to have had its parallax measured by the Hipparcos satellite. Earth-based measurement gives its parallax as 113.63 ± 1.97 milliarcseconds, yielding a distance of 28.7 ± 0.5 light-years. It is around 45% as massive as the Sun but has only 0.15% its luminosity.

References

Pyxis (constellation)
White dwarfs
0318
Durchmusterung objects